David McIntosh was a Scottish amateur football forward who played in the Scottish League for Queen's Park.

Personal life 
McIntosh served as a sergeant in the Highland Light Infantry during the First World War. He was evacuated to Britain after being wounded in late 1917.

Career statistics

References

Year of birth missing
Scottish footballers
Scottish Football League players
British Army personnel of World War I
Place of birth missing
Association football forwards
Queen's Park F.C. players
Date of death missing
Highland Light Infantry soldiers